The Rhodes Ranger 29 is an American trailerable sailboat that was designed by Philip Rhodes as a cruiser and first built in 1960. The boat is Rhodes' design #437.

The Rhodes Ranger 29 can be confused with the 1971 Gary Mull-designed Ranger 29.

A version built in the United Kingdom was marketed as the Santender 28.

Production
The design was built by de Visser Shipyard in the Netherlands, starting in 1960, but it is now out of production. Seafarer Yachts imported the design into the United States.

Design
The Rhodes Ranger 29 is a recreational keelboat, built predominantly of fiberglass, with wood trim. It has a masthead sloop rig; a spooned, raked stem; a raised counter, angled transom; a keel-mounted rudder controlled by a tiller and a fixed modified long keel, with a cutaway forefoot. It displaces  and carries  of iron ballast, or, optionally,  of lead ballast.

The boat is normally fitted with a small outboard motor mounted in the lazarette well, or, optionally, an inboard motor mounted over the keel, for docking and maneuvering.

The design has sleeping accommodation for four people, with a double "V"-berth in the bow cabin and two straight settee berths in the main cabin. The galley is located on both sides of the companionway ladder. The galley is equipped with a stove to port and a sink to starboard. The enclosed head is located just aft of the bow cabin on the port side, opposite a hanging locker.

See also
List of sailing boat types

References

Keelboats
1980s sailboat type designs
Sailing yachts 
Trailer sailers
Sailboat type designs by Philip Rhodes
Sailboat types built by de Visser Shipyard